Evert Grift (21 May 1922 – 27 March 2009) was a Dutch cyclist. He competed in the individual and team road race events at the 1948 Summer Olympics.

See also
 List of Dutch Olympic cyclists

References

External links
 

1922 births
2009 deaths
Dutch male cyclists
Olympic cyclists of the Netherlands
Cyclists at the 1948 Summer Olympics
Sportspeople from Utrecht (city)
Cyclists from Utrecht (province)